False Hopes is the debut EP by Dessa, a member of Minneapolis indie hip hop collective Doomtree. It was released on Doomtree Records in 2005.

In a 2008 interview with The A.V. Club, Dessa said, "I felt a little more confident in my ability, and I knew that some people in Minneapolis had liked the first project, so I felt a little more confident in my attack."

Track listing

References

External links
 

2005 EPs
Dessa albums
Doomtree Records albums